Patrick Ping Leung Tam (} is an Australian embryologist currently at University of Sydney, the Deputy Director of the Childrens Medical Research institute, the Distinguished Professor and Mok Hing-Yiu Distinguished Visiting Professor at University of Hong Kong.

He is an Elected Fellow of the Royal Society (2011), Australian Academy of Science, Royal Society of Biology and Society of Biology.

He is a cited pioneer in his field for studying mouse embryos, cells and biology.

He is a member of the Editorial Board for Developmental Cell.

Publications
SOX9 directly regulates the type-ll collagen gene, Nature, 1997
SOX9 binds DNA, activates transcription, and coexpresses with type II collagen during chondrogenesis in the mouse, Elsevier, 1997
Depletion of definitive gut endoderm in Sox17-null mutant mice, 2002, dev.biologists.org
Mouse gastrulation: the formation of a mammalian body plan, Elsevier, 1997
Gene function in mouse embryogenesis: get set for gastrulation, Nature Reviews, 2007

References

Academic staff of the University of Sydney
Australian biologists
Australian Fellows of the Royal Society
Living people
Year of birth missing (living people)
Fellows of the Australian Academy of Science
Hong Kong emigrants to Australia